Leptomyrmex erythrocephalus is a species of ant in the genus Leptomyrmex. Described by Johan Christian Fabricius in 1775, the species is endemic to Australia.

References

Dolichoderinae
Hymenoptera of Australia
Insects described in 1775
Taxa named by Johan Christian Fabricius